Tangshan is a coastal, industrial prefecture-level city in the northeast of Hebei province. It is located in the eastern part of Hebei Province and the northeastern part of the North China Plain. It is located in the central area of the Bohai Rim and serves as the main traffic corridor to the Northeast. The city faces the Bohai Sea in the south, the Yan Mountains in the north, Qinhuangdao across the Luan River to the east, and Tianjin to the west.

Much of the city's development is thanks to the industrialization, beginning in 1870, when Kailuan Group established coal mines in the region. It's the birthplace of China's first standard-gauge railway, the first railway plant, the first steam locomotive, and the first cement factory. It was hailed as China's "cradle of industrialization". Even today, Tangshan is a hub of steel, energy, chemical, and ceramics production. Ping opera, which originated from the city's Luanzhou county, is one of the five most popular Chinese operas.

The city has also become known for the 1976 Tangshan earthquake which measured 7.8 on the Richter scale, flattened much of the city, and killed at least 255,000 residents according to official estimates. The city has since been rebuilt, has become a tourist attraction, and is among the 10 largest ports in China.

It takes roughly 2 hours by road to get from Tangshan to Beijing and 1 hour by road to reach Tianjin. Tangshan's prefecture population was 7,717,983 at the 2020 census, with 3,687,607 in the built-up (or metro) area made of the 7 urban core districts.

In 2022, the Tangshan restaurant attack attracted the attention and discussion of the international community.

Etymology
Tangshan is named after Dacheng Hill, which was called Mount Tang (唐山), in the middle of the city.

In A.D. 645, Li Shimin, an emperor of Tang dynasty and his army were stationed at Dacheng Hill on his way back from the Korean Peninsula. Unfortunately, Caofei, his beloved concubine, died there. In order to commemorate her, he named the mountain with the name of the empire — Tang. Later, the city took the name of the mountain.

History

Early history
Tangshan has a long history, with ancient humans living in the area as early as 4,000 years ago. It fell within the territory of the Guzhu Kingdom (1600BC) at the time of the Shang dynasty and later became a part of the State of Yan, one of the seven Warring States (403221BC). During the Han dynasty (206BC220AD) it became part of the ancient province of Youzhou. It was under the jurisdiction of Zhili province and Zunhua State successively during the Qing dynasty.

Tang, Ming and Qing dynasties
Tangshan was a village at the time of the Tang dynasty (619907) and developed further in agriculture, oil exploitation and ceramics during the Ming dynasty (13681644).

During the Hundred Days' Reform in the late Qing dynasty, the Kaiping Mining Administration was established in the third year of the Guangxu Emperor (1877). In 1878, Qiaotun town was established at Tangshan and renamed Tangshan Town in 1889. In 1938, Tangshan City was formally founded. The administrative system of Tangshan during the Republic of China Republican era continued to follow the Qing system. In 1929, Zhili Province changed its name to Hebei Province. On January28, 1939, because of Tangshan's special economic and political position, the East Hebei Autonomous Government established Tangshan City which was initially called “Tangshan Municipal Government” and later changed to “Tangshan Municipal Office”. After Japan surrendered in 1945, the Chinese Nationalist Party in Peking (now known as Beijing) took over the political control of Tangshan from Japan and set up an Administration Inspectors Office. In April 1946, it was decided at the 132nd Meeting of the Chinese Communist Party Hebei Provincial Committee to set up Tangshan City and on May5 of the same year, the Tangshan Municipal government was founded.

People's Republic
After the establishment of the People's Republic of China on October1, 1949, Tangshan remained a provincially administered municipality with 12 areas under its jurisdiction.
In March 1955, it was decided at the 2nd session of the first People's Congress of Tangshan City to change Tangshan Municipal people's government to Tangshan people's committee without changing its administration areas.

On April28, 1958, the State Council approved the establishment of Tangshan prefecture. On August29, 1958, it was decided at the Seventh Session of the first People's Congress of Hebei Province to move the Tangshan Commissioner Office from Changli County to Tangshan City.

The CPC Central Committee decided to designate Tangshan city as one of the 45 cities open to the world on June3, 1959. On June 8, 1959, the CPC Hebei Provincial Committee and the Hebei Provincial People's Congress decided to combine the Tangshan Commissioners Office and the Tangshan People's Committee into the Tangshan People's Committee. On April2, 1960, the State Council officially approved the abolition of Tangshan prefecture. Qinhuangdao city, Qian'an, Changli, Laoting, Baodi, Yutian, Jixian County and Zunhua which were formerly administrated by Tangshan Prefecture were incorporated into the Tangshan Municipality. Luanxian County, Fengrun County (formerly a district) and Baigezhuang Farm were also incorporated into Tangshan Municipality. Meanwhile, Tangshan became a provincially administered municipality.

On May23, 1961, the State Council approved the reinstatement of Tangshan prefecture, which was adopted at the 14th Meeting of the Hebei Provincial People's Committee on  June3, 1959. Tangshan prefecture and Tangshan municipality were separated again and Tangshan turned into a specially administered municipality.

The Tangshan Municipal Revolutionary Committee affiliated to the Revolutionary Committee of Tangshan Region was set up on January6, 1968. On March 11, 1978, Tangshan turned to be a provincially administered municipality.

In October 1982, it was decided at the Seventh People's Congress of Tangshan city to abolish the Tangshan Municipal Revolutionary Committee and set up the Tangshan Municipal People's Government.

The State Council approved the move on March 3, 1983, and thereafter implemented the city-governing-county system. On May13, 1983, the Hebei Provincial People's Government announced the cancellation of the Civic Administration office of Tangshan region, which ceased operation on May15, 1983.

On December15, 1984, the State Council approved Tangshan city as one of 13 national “comparatively big” cities.

1976 Tangshan earthquake

Tangshan suffered an earthquake of magnitude 7.8 (7.5 according to official reports) at 3:42am on July28, 1976, which resulted in many casualties. The official death toll was 255,000, but many experts believe that the actual number of fatalities was two to three times that number, making it the most destructive earthquake in modern history. As a result of the earthquake, most of the town had to be rebuilt. The earthquake was depicted in the 2010 movie Aftershock.

Geography
Tangshan is located in the central section of the Bohai Economic Rim, facing the Bohai Sea to the south. Lying on the North China Plain, Tangshan is adjacent to the Yan Mountains to the north, borders the Luan River and Qinhuangdao to the east, and to the west and southwest borders Tianjin. Because of its location in the northeast of Hebei, it is a strategic area and a corridor linking two China's north and northeast regions. The largest river in the prefecture is the Luan River.

Climate
Tangshan has a monsoon-influenced, humid continental climate (Köppen Dwa), with cold and very dry winters, and hot, rainy summers. Spring and autumn are short with some rainfall. Close to 60% of the annual precipitation of  falls in July and August alone. The frost-free period lasts 180−190 days, and the area receives 2,600−2,900 hours of sunshine annually.

Air pollution

As air pollution in China has worsened in recent years, reports suggest cities in Hebei among the most polluted in the country, with Tangshan being no exception. According to a survey made by "Global voices China" in February 2013, 7 cities in Hebei including Xingtai, Shijiazhuang, Baoding, Handan, Langfang, Hengshui and Tangshan, are among China's 10 most polluted cities.

Economy

Tangshan is an important heavy industrial city in North China. Its output include machinery, motor vehicles, chemicals, textiles, glass, petroleum products, and cement. It has been a coal-mining center since late Qing dynasty, as Guangdong merchant Tong King-sing opened the first coal mine using modern techniques in Kaiping in 1877. Since the construction of the Caofeidian Project, it has hosted large iron and steel plants, chemical projects, and electricity plants. It is China's largest steel-producing city. Tangshan is also called the "porcelain capital of North China."

Modern industry in China first arose in Tangshan.  The second railway in Chinaafter the abortive Woosung Railway in Shanghaiwas the six-mile track laid between Hsukochuang and Tangshan which opened in 1881; this eventually grew into the Imperial Railroad of North China and China's modern Jingshan and Jingha Railways. The first fire-resistant material manufactory and the first and largest cement manufactory were constructed in Tangshan as well.

Tangshan has experienced near-constant GDP growth in recent years, but has slowed down in the latter-half of the 2010s. In 2008, the GDP of Tangshan was ¥353.747 billion, which nearly doubled to ¥612.121 billion by 2013, and grew further to ¥695.500 billion in 2018. Tangshan's GDP was ranked the 26th largest among Chinese cities according to data from 2017. The city's exports were valued at $7.109 billion in 2016. Government figures for 2017 show that the city's economy was largely dominated by the secondary industry, contributing ¥408.14 billion to the city's economy.

Industrial zone
Caofeidian New Zone.

Demographics
Government data from 2017 shows that 7.897 million people live in Tangshan, of which, 61.64% live in an urban area. The city's residents had a mean disposable income of ¥27,786, which was ¥36,415 among urban residents.

Ethnic composition 
Tangshan, like many other locations in China, is largely Han Chinese, who account for 95.25% of the city's population. In Zunhua City, there are 3 ethnic townships and ethnic towns. The following table shows the city's ethnic breakdown:

Administration
The prefecture-level city of Tangshan administers 14 county-level divisions including 7 districts, 4 counties and 3 county-level cities.

Education

Universities and colleges
North China University of Science and Technology (formerly named Hebei United University), which was co-established by Hebei Polytechnic University and North China Coal Medical College in May 2010 
Tangshan Normal University
Tangshan College
Hebei University of Science and Technology Tangshan Branch

High schools
Tangshan No.1 high school (founded 1902), one of the most famous high schools in China
 Hebei Tangshan Foreign Language School

Culture

Specialty
Diet
Wanlixiang Roast Chicken
Chessboard pancake
Honey sugar candy
Peanut crisp
Big gezhe
Small gezhe
Dried Fruits
Chinese chestnut
Walnut

Traditional Arts
Ping opera, or Pingju, one of the most popular operas in China
Tangshan Shadow Play
Laoting drums

Tourism
 Eastern Qing tombs
 Anti-Seismic Monument, located in Anti-Seismic Square
 Tangshan Nanhu Park (Lunan District)
 Kailuan National Mine Park (Lunan District)
 Tangshan science and Technology Museum (Lubei District)

Religion 
 Datang Xingguo Chan Temple, a Buddhist temple
 Jingzhong Mountain, a joint religious shrine for the believers of Confucianism, Buddhism, and Taoism, respectively.
 Two Christian churches.

Transport
As of 2017, Tangshan has 18,000 kilometers of roads, of which, 16,000 were in rural areas. The city's roads served 410 million tons of freight, and the city's port served 570 million tons.

Air
Tangshan Sannühe Airport,  from the city center, in Fengrun District

Rail
Beijing–Harbin Railway
Tianjin–Shanhaiguan Railway
Beijing-Qinhuangdao Railway
Tianjin-Shanxi Railway

Roads
China National Highway 102, in the south of Fengrun District
China National Highway 112, ring road encircling Beijing, traversing the west side of Tangshan's urban area
China National Highway 205, which runs along the eastern and southern front of the urban area
G1 Beijing–Harbin Expressway, on the northern side of the urban area
G25 Changchun–Shenzhen Expressway, on the western side of the urban area

Notable people
 Li Dazhao - early founder and leader of Chinese Communist Party
 Jiang Wen - a contemporary director and actor
 Cao Xueqin - author of Dream of the Red Chamber
 Liu Wenjin - classical Chinese music composer
 Zhang Tielin - Chinese-born British actor
 Zhao Lijian - Chinese spokesman of the Ministry of Foreign Affairs
 Gao Yuanyuan - Chinese actress and model
 Tseng Cheng - businessman and philanthropist
 Wu Guiying - Chinese Communist Party Secretary of Changsha
 Zhang Xudong - General of the PLA and former commander of the Western Theater Command
 Fu Zhenghua - Former politician and Minister of Justice

See also
List of twin towns and sister cities in China
1976 Tangshan earthquake
2022 Tangshan restaurant attack

References

External links 
 Official website of Tangshan Government 

 
Cities in Hebei
Prefecture-level divisions of Hebei
Cities destroyed by earthquakes